OLIS may refer to:
 OECD Committee Information Service, a statistical data source
 Oficjalna Lista Sprzedaży (OLiS), a Polish record chart
 Olís, Iceland Oil Ltd.
 Oxford Libraries Information System, a library catalog